KIAA1107 is a protein that in humans is encoded by the KIAA1107 gene. 

KIAA1107 is a Serine-rich protein, whose expression was found to increase in white matter of Multiple Sclerosis brain lesions.

Gene

General Information 
KIAA1107 is a protein encoding gene, located on chromosome 1 in Homo sapiens. Its exact location is at cytogenetic band 1p22.1, with the genomic location of 92,067,052 bp - 92,184,723 bp from pter, with 17,672 total bases.

The KIAA1107 gene contains nine known exons.

Protein

General Properties 
Uncharacterized Protein KIAA1107 is 1401 amino acids in length in the most common variant, isoform A, found in Homo sapiens.

The predicted molecular weight of isoform A in Homo sapiens is 149.6 kdal.

Composition 
KIAA1107 has a higher frequency of Serine and Aspartate and a lower frequency of Tyrosine than in the average protein in Homo sapiens. Uncharacterized protein is composed of 7.5% Aspartate and 14.0% Serine, which constitutes it as a Serine-rich protein. This protein also consists of 0.7% Tyrosine, which is considered to be below average in human proteins.

mRNA

Isoforms 
Transcription of KIAA1107 produces 6 different mRNAs, with 4 alternatively spliced variants and 2 unspliced forms. Variant A is the most commonly occurring and longest variant of KIAA1107 in humans.

Variant A contains nine exons (1-9) present in their standard form. Variant B contains seven exons (3-9) present in standard form. Variant C-U contains one exon, which is an alternatively spliced variant of exon 8. Variant D contains five exons (1-4, 5a) with 1-4 occurring in their standard form and an alternative form of exon 5. Variant E contains three exons, which are alternatively spliced forms of exons 3, 4, and 5. Variant F-U contains one exon, which is an alternatively spliced form of exon 5a, which occurs in variant D.

Conserved Domains 
There is a domain, DUF4596, present from 1311 - 1354 in KIAA1107. The function of this domain is unknown.

Expression

Tissue Expression 
Expression of KIAA1107 does not appear to be ubiquitous in Homo sapiens. KIAA1107 is found to be expressed mostly in the brain, with lower levels of expression occurring in the bladder, mammary gland, muscle, prostate, and testis.

Within the brain, KIAA1107 is expressed highest in the pineal gland, prefrontal cortex, cingulate cortex, and subthalamic nucleus.

Disease Association 
KIAA1107 was found to be over expressed in brain white matter with Multiple Sclerosis brain lesions when compared to control white matter. The average non-diseased sample had negligible expression of KIAA1107, while in the diseased sample it was expressed higher than almost any other gene (95th-98th percentile of expression).

Homology

Orthologs 
Orthologs of KIAA1107 exist in most vertebrates. The most distant homolog of KIAA1107 was found in, a fish, the Amazon Molly. There were no homologs found for sharks and rays, which would suggest that KIAA1107 originated in fish.

There are no human paralogs for KIAA1107.

References

Further reading